Charterhouse Capital Partners is a London based private equity investment firm focused on investing in European mid-market companies valued between €200m and €1.5bn. The company targets investments across the services, healthcare, specialised industrials and consumer sectors.

History
Founded in 1934, Charterhouse Capital Partners is one of Europe’s oldest private equity firms. The firm's predecessors, then a division of Charterhouse Bank, began raising third party equity in 1976. In June 2001, the firm's management completed a management buyout from HSBC to become an independent investment firm.

Notable investment activity
In 2009, Charterhouse acquired Wood Mackenzie, selling its stake to Hellman & Friedman in 2012.  

In 2010, the company acquired Deb Group, a skincare product group, and sold its stake in 2015 to SC Johnson, reportedly earning a return of over 2.5x. 

In 2010, they acquired Card Factory, exiting its stake in 2015. 

In 2011, the company acquired ERM, and in 2015, sold its stake to Omers in a deal valued at $1.7 billion. 

In 2011, they acquired Webhelp, selling the company to KKR in 2015. 

In 2013, Charterhouse acquired Doc Generici, an Italian pharmaceutical business, selling in 2016 to CVC Capital Partners.  

In 2013, the company acquired Armacell in a €520 million deal and, in 2015, sold to a Blackstone led partnership in a deal valued at €960 million.  

In 2016, the company acquired Cooper, a provider of generalist over-the-counter (OTC) self-care pharmaceuticals, and in March 2021 sold a majority stake to CVC. 
 
In 2017, the company acquired a majority stake in SERB, a Brussels headquartered specialty pharmaceuticals company.

In 2018, they acquired a majority stake in Siaci Saint Honore (SSH), a B2B insurance broker, and sold in July 2021 to a consortium led by Burrus Group.

In 2015, Charterhouse acquired Mirion Technologies, a radiation detection provider, for $750 million, and in June 2021, Mirion announced it would go public after merging with a Goldman Sachs backed SPAC in a deal valued at $2.6 billion.

References

External links
Company website

Financial services companies based in the City of London
Former HSBC subsidiaries
Private equity firms of the United Kingdom
1934 establishments in England